Longjing (Chosŏn'gŭl: 룡정; Hangul: 룽징) is a county-level city in Yanbian Korean Autonomous Prefecture, southeastern Jilin province, China. It lies on the Tumen River opposite the North Korean city Hoeryong. Longjing is "the birthplace of Chinese Korean folk culture, the area in China where Korean people live most concentratedly and where Korean folk culture is best preserved." 

Its population is approximately "167,000, including 110,800 Koreans, accounting for 66.4% of the total population." It borders Yanji and Tumen City on the northeast, Helong to the southwest, and Antu County in the southwest.

Longjing covers an area of 2,208.0 km2, with a forest coverage rate of 71.5%. It is rich in natural resources. "There are 1,072 species of wild economic plants in 124 families, including 186 species of precious medicinal plants. Wild economic animals include black bear, wild boar, Siberian roe deer, Rana chensinensis, etc." Longjing is famous for producing rice, Pyrus pyrifolia, Matsutake, red sun-cured tobacco, Yanbian cattle, and fine-wool sheep. It has the largest orchard in Asia - "万亩果园/10,000 Mu Orchard" (One "mu" is equal to 666.67 m2), the largest bear breeding base in China - "东方熊乐园/Oriental Bear Paradise" and the "吉林天佛指山国家级自然保护区/Jilin Tianfozhishan National Nature Reserve" which aims to protect Matsutake, Pinus densiflora and its ecosystem. 
 
There is a "朝鲜族民俗博物馆/Korean Folklore Museum" in Longjing, with a total construction area of 24,800 m2. The museum building covers an area of 2,200 m2. There are more than 3,000 Korean folk cultural relics in its collection, as well as more than 800 ancient historical relics and modern cultural relics. Among them, there are 53 "national-grade relics". 

Yun Dong-ju studied in Longjing.

Administrative divisions
Longjing has two subdistricts, six towns and two townships:
 Subdistricts
 Anmin Subdistrict ( / )
 Longmen Subdistrict ( / )
 Towns
 Chaoyangchuan ( / )
 Dongshengyong ( / )
 Kaishantun ( / )
 Laotougou ( / )
 Sanhe ( / )
 Zhixin ( / )
 Townships
 Baijin Township ( / )
 Dexin Township ( /)

Climate

References

External links 
 Official website (Chinese)

 
Cities in Yanbian
County-level divisions of Jilin